Tillman's Corner is an unincorporated community and census-designated place (CDP) in Mobile County, Alabama, United States. At the 2020 census, the population was 17,731. It is a part of the Mobile metropolitan area.

Geography
Tillman's Corner is located in southern Mobile County at  (30.583293, -88.197876). It is bordered to the northeast by the city of Mobile and to the southeast by Theodore. Interstate 10 forms the border between Tillmans Corner and Theodore, with access from Exit 13 (Theodore Dawes Road). I-10 leads northeast  to downtown Mobile and west  to the Pascagoula, Mississippi, area.

Demographics

2000 census
As of the census of 2000, there were 15,685 people, 5,904 households, and 4,457 families residing in the community. The racial makeup of the community was 93.57% White, 3.16% Black or African American, 0.61% Native American, 0.94% Asian, 0.01% Pacific Islander, 0.40% from other races, and 1.32% from two or more races. 1.22% of the population were Hispanic or Latino of any race.

There were 5,904 households, out of which 35.3% had children under the age of 18 living with them, 57.4% were married couples living together, 13.5% had a female householder with no husband present, and 24.5% were non-families. 20.2% of all households were made up of individuals, and 6.6% had someone living alone who was 65 years of age or older. The average household size was 2.65 and the average family size was 3.05.

In the community, the population was spread out, with 25.9% under the age of 18, 10.2% from 18 to 24, 29.3% from 25 to 44, 24.7% from 45 to 64, and 9.9% who were 65 years of age or older. The median age was 35 years. For every 100 females there were 95.7 males. For every 100 females age 18 and over, there were 93.4 males.

The median income for a household in the community was $34,309, and the median income for a family was $40,409. Males had a median income of $30,613 versus $21,637 for females. The per capita income for the community was $16,901. About 11.9% of families and 13.2% of the population were below the poverty line, including 18.5% of those under age 18 and 7.1% of those age 65 or over.

2010 census
As of the census of 2010, there were 17,398 people, 6,604 households, and 4,690 families residing in the community. The racial makeup of the community was 82.2% White, 11.4% Black or African American, 0.6% Native American, 2.1% Asian, 0.1% Pacific Islander, 1.6% from other races, and 1.9% from two or more races. 3.8% of the population were Hispanic or Latino of any race.

There were 6,604 households, out of which 31.1% had children under the age of 18 living with them, 47.7% were married couples living together, 16.9% had a female householder with no husband present, and 29.0% were non-families. 24.2% of all households were made up of individuals, and 8.7% had someone living alone who was 65 years of age or older. The average household size was 2.63 and the average family size was 3.09.

In the community, the population was spread out, with 25.6% under the age of 18, 9.7% from 18 to 24, 25.6% from 25 to 44, 26.5% from 45 to 64, and 12.6% who were 65 years of age or older. The median age was 36.1 years. For every 100 females there were 95.5 males. For every 100 females age 18 and over, there were 94.9 males.

The median income for a household in the community was $38,031, and the median income for a family was $44,784. Males had a median income of $38,617 versus $25,544 for females. The per capita income for the community was $18,291. About 18.4% of families and 20.4% of the population were below the poverty line, including 28.2% of those under age 18 and 8.5% of those age 65 or over.

2020 census

As of the 2020 United States census, there were 17,731 people, 6,400 households, and 4,384 families residing in the CDP.

Education
It is within the Mobile County Public School System.

Sections of the current CDP are served by Nan Gray Davis, Griggs, Haskew, and Meadowlake elementary schools. Middle schools serving sections of Tillmans Corner include Hankins Middle School and Burns Middle School. Much of it is zoned to Theodore High School while a small portion is zoned to Davidson High School.

Climate
The climate in this area is characterized by hot, humid summers and generally mild to cool winters.  According to the Köppen Climate Classification system, Tillmans Corner has a humid subtropical climate, abbreviated "Cfa" on climate maps.

References

Unincorporated communities in Alabama
Census-designated places in Mobile County, Alabama
Census-designated places in Alabama
Unincorporated communities in Mobile County, Alabama